Jeroy Robinson (born June 14, 1968) is a former American football linebacker. He played for the Denver Broncos and Phoenix Cardinals in 1990.

References

1968 births
Living people
American football linebackers
Texas A&M Aggies football players
Denver Broncos players
Phoenix Cardinals players